The Clarksville Historic District is a national historic district located at Clarksville, Mecklenburg County, Virginia. It encompasses 171 contributing buildings, 2 contributing sites, and 1 contributing structure in the central business district and surrounding residential areas of the town of Clarksille.  Notable buildings include the Planters Bank (1909), Planters Brick Tobacco Sales Warehouse (c. 1840), Gilliland Hotel (c. 1900), the Russell's Furniture, former Clarksville High School (1934), Clarksville Presbyterian Church (c. 1832), Mount Zion Baptist Church (c. 1875), Jamieson Memorial Methodist Episcopal Church (1901), St. Timothy's Episcopal Church (1917), and St. Catherine of Siena Roman Catholic Church (1947). Located in the district are the separately listed Clark Royster House and the Judge Henry Wood Jr. House.

It was listed on the National Register of Historic Places in 2002.

References

Historic districts on the National Register of Historic Places in Virginia
Federal architecture in Virginia
Greek Revival architecture in Virginia
Buildings and structures in Mecklenburg County, Virginia
National Register of Historic Places in Mecklenburg County, Virginia